Cotton Plant School District No. 1 was a school district headquartered in Cotton Plant, Arkansas.

On July 1, 2004, it merged into the Augusta School District.

References

Further reading
 Map of Arkansas School Districts pre-July 1, 2004
 (Download)

External links
 "Cotton Plant School District No. 1 Woodruff County, Arkansas General Purpose Financial Statements and Other Reports June 30, 2002"

2004 disestablishments in Arkansas
School districts disestablished in 2004
Defunct school districts in Arkansas
Education in Woodruff County, Arkansas